Benzamide is an organic compound with the chemical formula of C7H7NO. It is the simplest amide derivative of benzoic acid. In powdered form, it appears as a white solid, while in crystalline form, it appears as colourless crystals. It is slightly soluble in water, and soluble in many organic solvents. It is a natural alkaloid found in the herbs of Berberis pruinosa.

Chemical derivatives 

A number of substituted benzamides are commercial drugs, including:

See also

References

External links 
 Physical characteristics
 Safety MSDS data

 
Phenyl compounds